Lee City is an unincorporated community in Wolfe County, Kentucky, United States. It lies along Route 205 east of the city of Campton, the county seat of Wolfe County. Its elevation is 958 feet (292 m).

Notable person
Edgar Tolson, folk artist.
Roy Patrick

References 

Unincorporated communities in Wolfe County, Kentucky
Unincorporated communities in Kentucky